The 2013–14 San Antonio Spurs season was the 47th season of the franchise, their 41st in San Antonio and the 38th in the National Basketball Association (NBA). The Spurs entered the season as runner-ups of the 2013 NBA Finals, where they lost to the Miami Heat in seven games, marking the first time the Spurs lost in the NBA Finals. They also entered the season with an NBA-record ten international players.

Embarked by a 19-game winning streak from late February to early April, including an unbeaten month in March(16–0), The Spurs finished with the best record in the league at 62–20. Tied for the third highest win total in franchise history (67 by the 2015–16 Spurs, 63 by the 2005–06 Spurs, and 62 by the 1994–95 Spurs).

In the playoffs, the Spurs defeated Dallas Mavericks in seven games in the First Round, the Portland Trail Blazers in five games in the Semifinals, and the Oklahoma City Thunder in six games to advance to the NBA Finals for the sixth time in franchise history. This marked the first time that the Spurs have made back-to-back Finals appearances, also against the Miami Heat, whom they lost against in the previous year's NBA Finals. The Spurs avenged their NBA Finals loss and became NBA Champions after defeating Miami in five games, winning their fifth NBA Championship. The Spurs outscored the Heat in the series by the largest per game average point differential (14.0) in Finals history. San Antonio's Kawhi Leonard was named the Finals Most Valuable Player (MVP).

Pre-season
Total: 3–4 (Home: 2–2; Road: 1–2)

|- style="background:#cfc;"
| 1 
| October 9
| CSKA Moscow
| 
| Ginóbili & Mills (14)
| Jeff Ayres (8)
| Tony Parker (5)
| AT&T Center14,903
| 1–0
|- style="background:#fcc;"
| 2 
| October 13
| Phoenix
| 
| Tim Duncan (12)
| Courtney Fells (7)
| Green, Ginóbili, Ayres (5)
| AT&T Center16,203
| 1–1
|- style="background:#fcc;"
| 3 
| October 14
| @ Denver
| 
| Leonard & Joseph (13)
| Kawhi Leonard (12)
| Leonard, Diaw, Splitter (4)
| Pepsi Center14,671
| 1–2
|- style="background:#cfc;"
| 4 
| October 17
| @ Atlanta
| 
| Tony Parker (17)
| Tim Duncan (8)
| Tony Parker (5)
| Philips Arena8,166
| 2–2
|- style="background:#fcc;"
| 5 
| October 19
| @ Miami
| 
| Kawhi Leonard (17)
| Aron Baynes (7)
| Boris Diaw (5)
| American Airlines Arena20,080
| 2–3
|- style="background:#cfc;"
| 6 
| October 22
| Orlando
| 
| Patrick Mills (22)
| Tim Duncan (7)
| Tim Duncan (7)
| AT&T Center16,326
| 3–3
|- style="background:#fcc;"
| 7 
| October 24
| Houston
| 
| Aron Baynes (16)
| Tim Duncan (8)
| Patrick Mills (6)
| AT&T Center16,247
| 3–4

Roster

Regular season

Standings

Game log

|- style="background:#cfc;"
| 1 
| October 30
| Memphis
| 
| Kawhi Leonard, Boris Diaw (14)
| Tiago Splitter (8)
| Tony Parker (9)
| AT&T Center18,581
| 1–0

|- style="background:#cfc;"
| 2 
| November 1
| @ L.A. Lakers
| 
| Tony Parker (24)
| Tiago Splitter (14)
| Tony Parker (6)
| Staples Center18,997
| 2–0
|- style="background:#fcc;"
| 3 
| November 2
| @ Portland
| 
| Tim Duncan (24)
| Tim Duncan (7)
| Tony Parker (9)
| Moda Center20,028
| 2–1
|- style="background:#cfc;"
| 4 
| November 5
| @ Denver
| 
| Tony Parker (24)
| Tim Duncan, Tiago Splitter, Boris Diaw (8)
| Tim Duncan (8)
| Pepsi Center15,721
| 3–1
|- style="background:#cfc;"
| 5 
| November 6
| Phoenix
| 
| Tony Parker (20)
| Tiago Splitter (7)
| Tony Parker (6)
| AT&T Center17,870
| 4–1
|- style="background:#cfc;"
| 6 
| November 8
| Golden State
| 
| Tony Parker (18)
| Tiago Splitter (8)
| Tim Duncan (5)
| AT&T Center18,581
| 5–1
|- style="background:#cfc;"
| 7 
| November 10
| @ New York
| 
| Danny Green (24)
| Tim Duncan, Danny Green (10)
| Tony Parker (6)
| Madison Square Garden19,812
| 6–1
|- style="background:#cfc;"
| 8 
| November 11
| @ Philadelphia
| 
| Danny Green (18)
| Kawhi Leonard (9)
| Tony Parker (9)
| Wells Fargo Center12,424
| 7–1
|- style="background:#cfc;"
| 9 
| November 13
| Washington
| 
| Tony Parker (16)
| Tiago Splitter (9)
| Marco Belinelli (8)
| AT&T Center18,581
| 8–1
|- style="background:#cfc;"
| 10 
| November 15
| @ Utah
| 
| Tony Parker (22)
| Kawhi Leonard, Tim Duncan, Manu Ginóbili (9)
| Tony Parker (6)
| EnergySolutions Arena17,530
| 9–1
|- style="background:#cfc;"
| 11 
| November 20
| Boston
| 
| Tony Parker (19)
| Tiago Splitter (10)
| Manu Ginóbili (6)
| AT&T Center18,581
| 10–1
|- style="background:#cfc;"
| 12 
| November 22
| @ Memphis
| 
| Tony Parker (20)
| Kawhi Leonard (9)
| Manu Ginóbili (7)
| FedExForum17,109
| 11–1
|- style="background:#cfc;"
| 13 
| November 23
| Cleveland
| 
| Danny Green (17)
| Tim Duncan (6)
| Tony Parker 7
| AT&T Center18,581
| 12–1
|- style="background:#cfc;"
| 14 
| November 25
| New Orleans
|  
| Manu Ginóbili (16)
| Kawhi Leonard (11)
| Tony Parker (7)
| AT&T Center18,323
| 13–1
|- style="background:#fcc;"
| 15 
| November 27
| @ Oklahoma City
| 
| Tony Parker (16)
| Kawhi Leonard (10)
| Tony Parker (7)
| Chesapeake Energy Arena18,203
| 13–2
|- style="background:#cfc;"
| 16 
| November 29
| @ Orlando
| 
| Tim Duncan (19)
| Tim Duncan (9)
| Manu Ginóbili (5)
| Amway Center15,159
| 14–2
|- style="background:#fcc;"
| 17 
| November 30
| Houston
| 
| Tony Parker (27)
| Tim Duncan (8)
| Manu Ginóbili (11)
| AT&T Center18,581
| 14–3

|- style="background:#cfc;"
| 18 
| December 2
| Atlanta
|  
| Tim Duncan (23)
| Tim Duncan (21)
| Tony Parker (7)
| AT&T Center17,318
| 15–3
|- style="background:#ccc;"
| N/A 
| December 4
| @ Minnesota
| colspan="7" | Game cancelled then rescheduled for April 8, 2014 due to building smoke.
|- style="background:#fcc;"
| 19 
| December 7
| Indiana
| 
| Kawhi Leonard (18)
| Tim Duncan (6)
| Patty Mills (6)
| AT&T Center18,581
| 15–4
|- style="background:#cfc;"
| 20 
| December 10
| @ Toronto
| 
| Manu Ginóbili (16)
| Kawhi Leonard (7)
| Manu Ginóbili (9)
| Air Canada Centre17,702
| 16–4
|- style="background:#cfc;"
| 21 
| December 11
| @ Milwaukee
| 
| Tim Duncan (21)
| Tim Duncan (16)
| Tony Parker (5)
| BMO Harris Bradley Center11,087
| 17–4
|- style="background:#cfc;"
| 22 
| December 13
| Minnesota
| 
| Tony Parker (29)
| Tim Duncan (14)
| Manu Ginóbili (9)
| AT&T Center18,581
| 18–4
|- style="background:#cfc;"
| 23 
| December 14
| @ Utah
| 
| Tim Duncan (22)
| Tim Duncan (12)
| Tony Parker (7)
| EnergySolutions Arena19,330
| 19–4
|- style="background:#fcc;"
| 24 
| December 16
| @ L.A. Clippers
| 
| Tim Duncan (17)
| Tim Duncan (11)
| Tony Parker (6)
| Staples Center19,253
| 19–5
|- style="background:#cfc;"
| 25 
| December 18
| @ Phoenix
|  
| Manu Ginóbili (24)
| Tim Duncan (13)
| Manu Ginóbili (7)
| US Airways Center13,661
| 20–5
|- style="background:#cfc;"
| 26 
| December 19
| @ Golden State
|  
| Marco Belinelli (28)
| Kawhi Leonard (10)
| Boris Diaw (6)
| Oracle Arena19,596
| 21–5
|- style="background:#fcc;"
| 27 
| December 21
| Oklahoma City
|  
| Tony Parker (23)
| Tiago Splitter (11)
| Tony Parker (8)
| AT&T Center18,581
| 21–6
|- style="background:#cfc;"
| 28 
| December 23
| Toronto
|  
| Tony Parker (26)
| Tim Duncan (12)
| Tony Parker (8)
| AT&T Center18,581
| 22–6
|- style="background:#fcc;"
| 29 
| December 25
| Houston
|  
| Manu Ginóbili (22)
| Tim Duncan (14)
| Tim Duncan (5)
| AT&T Center18,581
| 22–7
|- style="background:#cfc;"
| 30 
| December 26
| @ Dallas
| 
| Tony Parker (23)
| Tim Duncan (13)
| Boris Diaw (5)
| American Airlines Center20,305
| 23–7
|- style="background:#cfc;"
| 31 
| December 29
| Sacramento
| 
| Manu Ginóbili (28)
| Tim Duncan (13)
| Tony Parker, Boris Diaw (7)
| AT&T Center18,581
| 24–7
|- style="background:#cfc;"
| 32 
| December 31
| Brooklyn
| 
| Tony Parker (18)
| Jeff Ayres (8)
| Tony Parker (6)
| AT&T Center17,409
| 25–7

|- style="background:#fcc;"
| 33 
| January 2
| New York
| 
| Marco Belinelli (32)
| Tim Duncan (7)
| Manu Ginóbili (12)
| AT&T Center18,581
| 25–8
|- style="background:#cfc;"
| 34 
| January 4
| L.A. Clippers
| 
| Tiago Splitter (22)
| Tim Duncan (11)
| Tony Parker (9) 
| AT&T Center18,581
| 26–8
|- style="background:#cfc;"
| 35 
| January 7
| @ Memphis
| 
| Tim Duncan (24)
| Tim Duncan (17)
| Tony Parker, Manu Ginóbili (6)
| FedExForum15,916
| 27–8
|- style="background:#cfc;"
| 36 
| January 8
| Dallas
| 
| Tony Parker (25)
| Tim Duncan (13)
| Tony Parker (7)
| AT&T Center18,581
| 28–8
|- style="background:#cfc;"
| 37 
| January 12
| Minnesota
| 
| Kawhi Leonard (17)
| Tim Duncan (8)
| Tony Parker (10
| AT&T Center18,098
| 29–8
|- style="background:#cfc;"
| 38 
| January 13
| @ New Orleans
| 
| Tony Parker (27)
| Tim Duncan (9)
| Tony Parker (7)
| New Orleans Arena15,552
| 30–8
|- style="background:#cfc;"
| 39 
| January 15
| Utah
| 
| Tony Parker (25)
| Tim Duncan (8)
| Tony Parker (9)
| AT&T Center17,917
| 31–8
|- style="background:#fcc;"
| 40 
| January 17
| Portland
| 
| Manu Ginóbili (29)
| Kawhi Leonard (9)
| Manu Ginóbili (5)
| AT&T Center18,581
| 31–9
|- style="background:#cfc;"
| 41 
| January 19
| Milwaukee
| 
| Patrick Mills (20)
| Tim Duncan (13)
| Patrick Mills, Manu Ginóbili (7)
| AT&T Center18,096
| 32–9
|- style="background:#fcc;"
| 42 
| January 22
| Oklahoma City
| 
| Tony Parker (37)
| Tim Duncan (13)
| Tony Parker, Jeff Ayres (4)
| AT&T Center18,581
| 32–10
|- style="background:#cfc;"
| 43 
| January 24
| @ Atlanta
| 
| Boris Diaw (21)
| Tim Duncan (13)
| Tony Parker (7)
| Philips Arena17,601
| 33–10
|- style="background:#fcc;"
| 44 
| January 26
| @ Miami
| 
| Tim Duncan (23)
| Aron Baynes (6)
| Tony Parker (7)
| American Airlines Arena19,683
| 33–11
|- style="background:#fcc;"
| 45 
| January 28
| @ Houston
| 
| Boris Diaw (22)
| Tim Duncan (14)
| Cory Joseph (5)
| Toyota Center18,314
| 33–12
|- style="background:#fcc;"
| 46 
| January 29
| Chicago
| 
| Tony Parker (20)
| Tim Duncan (12)
| Tony Parker (6)
| AT&T Center18,581
| 33–13

|- style="background:#cfc;"
| 47 
| February 1
| Sacramento
| 
| Tim Duncan (23)
| Tim Duncan (17)
| Tony Parker (10)
| AT&T Center18,581
| 34–13
|- style="background:#cfc;"
| 48 
| February 3
| @ New Orleans
| 
| Tony Parker (32)
| Tim Duncan, Danny Green, Tiago Splitter (7)
| Tony Parker (9)
| New Orleans Arena17,086
| 35–13
|- style="background:#cfc;"
| 49 
| February 5
| @ Washington
| 
| Tim Duncan (31)
| Tiago Splitter (12)
| Tim Duncan, Tony Parker (5)
| Verizon Center15,791
| 36–13
|- style="background:#fcc;"
| 50 
| February 6
| @ Brooklyn
| 
| Cory Joseph (18)
| Danny Green (7)
| Danny Green, Cory Joseph (3)
| Barclays Center17,732
| 36–14
|- style="background:#cfc;"
| 51 
| February 8
| @ Charlotte
| 
| Patrick Mills (32)
| Tim Duncan (13)
| Tony Parker (5)
| Time Warner Cable Arena19,084
| 37–14
|- style="background:#fcc;"
| 52 
| February 10
| @ Detroit
| 
| Marco Belinelli (20)
| Tim Duncan (8)
| Cory Joseph (9)
| Palace of Auburn Hills13,628
| 37–15
|- style="background:#cfc;"
| 53 
| February 12
| @ Boston
| 
| Tim Duncan (25)
| Marco Belinelli (11)
| Marco Belinelli (8)
| TD Garden17,922
| 38–15
|- align="center"
|colspan="9" bgcolor="#bbcaff"|All-Star Break
|- style="background:#cfc;"
| 54 
| February 18
| @ L.A. Clippers
| 
| Patrick Mills (25)
| Tim Duncan (13)
| Tim Duncan (7)
| Staples Center19,257
| 39–15
|- style="background:#cfc;"
| 55 
| February 19
| @ Portland
| 
| Patrick Mills (29)
| Danny Green (7)
| Cory Joseph, Manu Ginóbili (4)
| Moda Center20,057
| 40–15
|- style="background:#fcc;"
| 56 
| February 21
| @ Phoenix
| 
| Danny Green (15)
| Matt Bonner (7)
| Marco Belinelli (4)
| US Airways Center18,422
| 40–16
|- style="background:#cfc;"
| 57 
| February 26
| Detroit
| 
| Marco Belinelli (20)
| Tim Duncan (9)
| Manu Ginóbili (9)
| AT&T Center18,581
| 41–16
|- style="background:#cfc;"
| 58 
| February 28
| Charlotte
| 
| Tim Duncan (17)
| Tim Duncan (16)
| Boris Diaw (7)
| AT&T Center18,581
| 42–16

|- style="background:#cfc;"
| 59 
| March 2
| Dallas
| 
| Tony Parker (22)
| Boris Diaw (10)
| Tony Parker, Manu Ginóbili (7)
| AT&T Center18,581
| 43–16
|- style="background:#cfc;"
| 60 
| March 4
| @ Cleveland
|  
| Danny Green (24)
| Tim Duncan (8)
| Manu Ginóbili (6)
| Quicken Loans Arena17,966
| 44–16
|- style="background:#cfc;"
| 61 
| March 6
| Miami
| 
| Tim Duncan (23)
| Tim Duncan (11)
| Boris Diaw (5)
| AT&T Center18,581
| 45–16
|- style="background:#cfc;"
| 62 
| March 8
| Orlando
| 
| Tony Parker (30)
| Tim Duncan (10)
| Tony Parker, Manu Ginóbili (5)
| AT&T Center18,581
| 46–16
|- style="background:#cfc;"
| 63 
| March 11
| @ Chicago
| 
| Manu Ginóbili (22)
| Tim Duncan, Kawhi Leonard (9)
| Tony Parker (9)
| United Center21,634
| 47–16
|- style="background:#cfc;"
| 64 
| March 12
| Portland
| 
| Patty Mills (15)
| Tim Duncan (11)
| Tony Parker (5)
| AT&T Center18,581
| 48–16
|- style="background:#cfc;"
| 65 
| March 14
| L.A. Lakers
| 
| Danny Green (15)
| Matt Bonner (10)
| Cory Joseph (7)
| AT&T Center18,581
| 49–16
|- style="background:#cfc;"
| 66 
| March 16
| Utah
| 
| Manu Ginóbili (21)
| Tiago Splitter (10)
| Tony Parker (7)
| AT&T Center18,242
| 50–16
|- style="background:#cfc;"
| 67 
| March 19
| @ L.A. Lakers
| 
| Tony Parker (25)
| Tim Duncan (16)
| Tim Duncan, Boris Diaw, Manu Ginóbili (6)
| Staples Center18,997
| 51–16
|- style="background:#cfc;"
| 68 
| March 21
| @ Sacramento
| 
| Marco Belinelli (17)
| Tiago Splitter (11)
| Tim Duncan (6)
| Sleep Train Arena17,317
| 52–16
|- style="background:#cfc;"
| 69 
| March 22
| @ Golden State
| 
| Tony Parker (20)
| Tiago Splitter (14)
| Boris Diaw, Tony Parker & Patty Mills (5)
| Oracle Arena19,596
| 53–16
|- style="background:#cfc;"
| 70 
| March 24
| Philadelphia
| 
| Austin Daye (22)
| Cory Joseph (7)
| Marco Belinelli (8)
| AT&T Center17,798
| 54–16
|- style="background:#cfc;"
| 71 
| March 26
| Denver
| 
| Tim Duncan (29)
| Tim Duncan (13)
| Manu Ginóbili (7)
| AT&T Center17,949
| 55–16
|- style="background:#cfc;"
| 72 
| March 28
| @ Denver
| 
| Marco Belinelli (27)
| Tiago Splitter (12)
| Tiago Splitter (7)
| Pepsi Center19,155
| 56–16
|- style="background:#cfc;"
| 73 
| March 29
| New Orleans
| 
| Marco Belinelli (18)
| Tim Duncan (8)
| Tim Duncan (6)
| AT&T Center18,581
| 57–16
|- style="background:#cfc;"
| 74 
| March 31
| @ Indiana
| 
| Tony Parker (22)
| Kawhi Leonard (11)
| Tim Duncan, Tony Parker, Boris Diaw (4)
| Bankers Life Fieldhouse18,165
| 58–16

|- style="background:#cfc;"
| 75 
| April 2
| Golden State
| 
| Tony Parker (18)
| Tim Duncan (8)
| Tony Parker (8)
| AT&T Center18,581
| 59–16
|- style="background:#fcc;"
| 76 
| April 3
| @ Oklahoma City
| 
| Patty Mills (21)
| Tim Duncan (8)
| Tony Parker, Kawhi Leonard (3)
| Chesapeake Energy Arena18,203
| 59–17
|- style="background:#cfc;"
| 77 
| April 6
| Memphis
| 
| Kawhi Leonard, Manu Ginóbili (26)
| Patty Mills (6)
| Kawhi Leonard, Cory Joseph (5)
| AT&T Center18,581
| 60–17
|- style="background:#fcc;"
| 78
| April 8
| @ Minnesota
| 
| Boris Diaw, Cory Joseph (13)
| Tim Duncan, Kawhi Leonard (6)
| Boris Diaw (5)
| Target Center10,117
| 60–18
|- style="background:#cfc;"
| 79 
| April 10
| @ Dallas
| 
| Patty Mills (26)
| Kawhi Leonard (16)
| Manu Ginóbili (7)
| American Airlines Center20,324
| 61–18
|- style="background:#cfc;"
| 80 
| April 11
| Phoenix
| 
| Danny Green (33)
| Jeff Ayres (10)
| Boris Diaw (6)
| AT&T Center18,581
| 62–18
|- style="background:#fcc;"
| 81 
| April 14
| @ Houston
| 
| Marco Belinelli (17)
| Damion James, Tim Duncan (9)
| Boris Diaw (6)
| Toyota Center18,406
| 62–19
|- style="background:#fcc;"
| 82 
| April 16
| L.A. Lakers
| 
| Kawhi Leonard (14)
| Matt Bonner, Tiago Splitter (8)
| Manu Ginóbili (5)
| AT&T Center18,581
| 62–20

Playoffs

Game log

|- style="background:#cfc;"
| 1
| April 20
| Dallas
| 
| Tim Duncan (27)
| Tiago Splitter (11)
| Tony Parker (6)
| AT&T Center18,581
| 1–0
|- style="background:#fcc;"
| 2
| April 23
| Dallas
| 
| Manu Ginóbili (27)
| Tim Duncan (7)
| Manu Ginóbili (4)
| AT&T Center18,581
| 1–1
|- style="background:#fcc;"
| 3
| April 26
| @ Dallas
| 
| Tim Duncan (22)
| Tiago Splitter (13)
| Tony Parker (6)
| American Airlines Center20,636
| 1–2
|- style="background:#cfc;"
| 4
| April 28
| @ Dallas
| 
| Manu Ginóbili (23)
| Tiago Splitter, Kawhi Leonard (12)
| Manu Ginóbili (5)
| American Airlines Center20,796
| 2–2
|- style="background:#cfc;"
| 5
| April 30
| Dallas
| 
| Tony Parker (23)
| Tim Duncan, Tiago Splitter (12)
| Boris Diaw (6)
| AT&T Center18,581
| 3–2
|- style="background:#fcc;"
| 6
| May 2
| @ Dallas
| 
| Tony Parker (22)
| Tim Duncan (9)
| Tony Parker (6)
| American Airlines Center20,799
| 3–3
|- style="background:#cfc;"
| 7
| May 4
| Dallas
| 
| Tony Parker (32)
| Tim Duncan (8)
| Manu Ginóbili, Boris Diaw (5)
| AT&T Center18,581
| 4–3

|- style="background:#cfc;"
| 1
| May 6
| Portland
|  
| Tony Parker (33)
| Tim Duncan (11)
| Tony Parker (9)
| AT&T Center18,581
| 1–0
|- style="background:#cfc;"
| 2
| May 8
| Portland
| 
| Kawhi Leonard (20)
| Tiago Splitter (10)
| Tony Parker (10)
| AT&T Center18,581
| 2–0
|- style="background:#cfc;"
| 3
| May 10
| @ Portland
| 
| Tony Parker (29)
| Kawhi Leonard (10)
| Tony Parker (6)
| Moda Center20,321
| 3–0
|- style="background:#fcc;"
| 4
| May 12
| @ Portland
| 
| Tony Parker (14)
| Tim Duncan (9)
| Kawhi Leonard (3)
| Moda Center20,141
| 3–1
|- style="background:#cfc;"
| 5
| May 14
| Portland
| 
| Danny Green, Kawhi Leonard (22)
| Danny Green (9)
| Tiago Splitter (7)
| AT&T Center18,581
| 4–1

|- style="background:#cfc;"
| 1
| May 19
| Oklahoma City
| 
| Tim Duncan (27)
| Tiago Splitter (8)
| Tony Parker (12)
| AT&T Center18,581
| 1–0
|- style="background:#cfc;"
| 2
| May 21
| Oklahoma City
| 
| Tony Parker (22)
| Tim Duncan (12)
| Tony Parker (5)
| AT&T Center18,581
| 2–0
|- style="background:#fcc;"
| 3
| May 25
| @ Oklahoma City
| 
| Manu Ginóbili (23)
| Tim Duncan, Tiago Splitter (8)
| Boris Diaw (6)
| Chesapeake Energy Arena18,203
| 2–1
|- style="background:#fcc;"
| 4
| May 27
| @ Oklahoma City
| 
| Ginobili & Parker (14)
| Boris Diaw (10)
| Tim Duncan, Tony Parker (4)
| Chesapeake Energy Arena18,203
| 2–2
|- style="background:#cfc;"
| 5
| May 29
| Oklahoma City
| 
| Tim Duncan (22)
| Tim Duncan (12)
| Manu Ginóbili (6)
| AT&T Center18,581
| 3–2
|- style="background:#cfc;"
| 6
| May 31
| @ Oklahoma City
| 
| Boris Diaw (26)
| Tim Duncan (15)
| Manu Ginóbili (5)
| Chesapeake Energy Arena18,203
| 4–2

|- style="background:#cfc;"
| 1
| June 5
| Miami
| 
| Tim Duncan (21)
| Tim Duncan, Boris Diaw (10)
| Manu Ginóbili (11)
| AT&T Center18,581
| 1–0
|- style="background:#fcc;"
| 2
| June 8
| Miami
| 
| Tony Parker (21)
| Tim Duncan (15)
| Tony Parker (7)
| AT&T Center18,581
| 1–1
|- style="background:#cfc;"
| 3
| June 10
| @ Miami
| 
| Kawhi Leonard (29)
| Tim Duncan (6)
| Tony Parker, Patty Mills (4)
| American Airlines Arena19,900
| 2–1
|- style="background:#cfc;"
| 4
| June 12
| @ Miami
| 
| Kawhi Leonard (20)
| Kawhi Leonard (14)
| Boris Diaw (9)
| American Airlines Arena19,900
| 3–1
|- style="background:#cfc;"
| 5
| June 15
| Miami
| 
| Kawhi Leonard (22)
| Kawhi Leonard (10)
| Boris Diaw (6)
| AT&T Center18,581
| 4–1

Player statistics

Regular season

Playoffs

See also

References

San Antonio Spurs seasons
San Antonio Spurs
Western Conference (NBA) championship seasons
NBA championship seasons
San Antonio
San Antonio